Indonesians in Pakistan are a small expatriate community.

Community
The Indonesian community in Pakistan comprises diplomats and consular staff, migrants and their families, employees working for multinational corporations, international students, tourists and Indonesian spouses married to Pakistanis. There are a few hundred Indonesian students pursuing education in various Pakistani universities and institutes. A large number of the Indonesian pupils are religious students receiving Islamic education from madrasas or Islamic universities.

Organisations
Indonesia has an embassy in Islamabad and a consulate-general in Karachi. Both diplomatic missions provide consular services to Indonesian citizens in Pakistan.

See also

 Pakistanis in Indonesia 
 Indonesia–Pakistan relations

References

External links
 Indonesian Embassy, Islamabad
 Consulate-General of the Republic of Indonesia, Karachi

 
Pakistan
Immigration to Pakistan
Indonesia–Pakistan relations